The 2010 M&M Meat Shops Canadian Junior Curling Championships was held January 16–24 at the Colisée Cardin and at the Club Curling Aurèle-Racine in Sorel-Tracy, Quebec.

Men's

Teams

Standings

Scores
Draw 1

Draw 2

Draw 3

Draw 4

Draw 5

Draw 6

Draw 7

Draw 8

Draw 9

Draw 10

Draw 11

Draw 12

Draw 13

Draw 14

Draw 15

Draw 16

Draw 17

Draw 18

Draw 19

Draw 20

Playoffs

Semifinal

Final

Women's

Teams

Standings

Scores
Draw 1

Draw 2

Draw 3

Draw 4

Draw 5

Draw 6

Draw 7

Draw 8

Draw 9

Draw 10

Draw 11

Draw 12

Draw 13

Draw 14

Draw 15

Draw 16

Draw 17

Draw 18

Draw 19

Draw 20

Playoffs

Tiebreaker #1

Tiebreaker #2

Semifinal

Final

Qualification

Ontario
The Pepsi Ontario Junior Curling Championships were held January 2–6 at the Teeswater Curling Club in Teeswater.

Rachel Homan and her rink from the Ottawa Curling Club defeated Clancy Grandy of Guelph 8-4 in the women's final. Grandy had beaten Jenna Harrington of Dundas in the semifinal. Homan finished the round robin with a 6-1 record while Grandy and Harrington had 5-2 records. In the men's final, Jake Walker out of the Westmount club defeated Mathew Camm of Navan 7-1. Walker won his semifinal match against the Rideau Curling Club's Kurtis Byrd rink 5-4. Byrd made the playoffs after winning a tiebreaker against Michael Bryson of the Annandale Country Club, 8-7.

References

External links
Official site - Archived

Canadian Junior Curling Championships
Sport in Sorel-Tracy
Curling competitions in Quebec
Canadian Junior Curling Championships
Canadian Junior Curling Championships